Erold Naomab (born 2 April 1977) is a Namibian academic. He is the vice-chancellor of the Namibia University of Science and Technology (NUST).

Early life and education

Naomab was born on 2 April 1977. He grew up Omaruru in the Erongo Region of Namibia. He attended schools in Omaruru, Okombahe and Otjiwarongo. After a brief stint at a consultancy firm Naomab started tertiary education at the University of Namibia, graduating with Bachelor and Master of Science. He then studied at Nottingham Trent University in England and obtained another master degree (Research in Strategic Resource Management) as well as a PhD in Science.

Career
Naomab worked at the Southern Campus of the University of Namibia (UNAM) in Keetmanshoop where he rose to the position of assistant pro-vice chancellor, UNAM's highest-ranking administrator at that campus. In January 2021 he was appointed vice-chancellor of the Namibia University of Science and Technology (NUST), succeeding the founding rector Tjama Tjivikua, and taking over from Andrew Niikondo who acted in that position.

References 

1977 births
Living people
People from Erongo Region
University of Namibia alumni
Academic staff of the University of Namibia
Alumni of Nottingham Trent University
Academic staff of the Namibia University of Science and Technology